The Pura Belpré Award is a recognition presented to a Latino or Latina author and illustrator whose work best portrays the Latino cultural experience in a work of literature for children or youth. It was established in 1996. It was given every other year since 1996 until 2009 when it was changed to be given annually.

The award is named in honor of Pura Belpré, the first Latina librarian from the New York Public Library. As a children's librarian, storyteller, and author, she enriched the lives of Latino children through her pioneering work of preserving and disseminating Puerto Rican folklore.

The award is given by the Association for Library Service to Children (ALSC), a division of the American Library Association (ALA), and the National Association to Promote Library and Information Services to Latinos and the Spanish-Speaking (REFORMA).

Criteria
 Two medals shall be awarded at the annual conference of the American Library Association, one to a Latino author and one to a Latino illustrator, for creating outstanding original children's (age 0-14) books that portray, affirm, and celebrate the Latino cultural experience.
 For purposed of this award, Latino is defined as people whose heritage emanates from any of the Spanish-speaking cultures of the Western Hemisphere.
 The award-winning books must be published in the United States or Puerto Rico.
 The committee is not to consider the entire body of work by an author or whether the author has previously won the award.
 Recipients of the Pura Belpré Medal must be residents or citizens of the United States or Puerto Rico.
 Fiction and nonfiction books for children published in Spanish, English, or bilingual format are eligible.
 Honor books may be named.
 If suitable candidates are not found, the awards will not be presented in that year.
 One person may be selected to receive the awards in both categories.

Recipients

Recipients of multiple medals and honors
George Ancona, Yuyi Morales, and Duncan Tonatiuh have received medals or honors for their roles as both author and illustrator. Duncan Tonatiuh is the only person to receive multiple awards in one year for two different works.

Belpré Medals

One person has won six Belpré Medals.
 Yuyi Morales, as illustrator 2004, 2008, 2009, 2014, 2015, 2019.

Two people have won three Belpré Medals.
 Margarita Engle, as author 2008, 2009, 2016.
 Rafael López as illustrator 2010, 2016, 2020

Multiple people have won two Belpré Medals: Julia Alvarez as author, Susan Guevara as illustrator, and Pam Muñoz Ryan as author.

Belpré Honors

One person has won eight Belpré Honors.
 Duncan Tonatiuh, as illustrator 2011, 2014, 2015, 2016, and twice in 2017; as author 2014 and 2020.

Two people won four Belpré Honors
David Diaz, as illustrator 2004, 2006, 2010, 2011.
 Yuyi Morales, as illustrator 2004, 2010; 2022; as author 2009.

Multiple people have won three Belpré Honors.
 Francisco X. Alarcón, as author 1998, 2000, 2002.
 George Ancona, as illustrator 1996, 2000; as author 2011.
 Carmen T. Bernier-Grand, as author 2006, 2008, 2010.
 Lulu Delacre, as illustrator 1996, 2006, 2009.
 Margarita Engle, as author 2011, 2012, 2014.
 Rafael López, as illustrator 2006, 2012, 2014.
 John Parra, as illustrator 2010, 2015, 2018.

Multiple people have won two Belpré Honors. As illustrator: Amy Córdova, Angela Dominguez, and Carmen Lomas Garza.
As author: Juan Felipe Herrera, David Bowles and Francisco Jiménez as author.

Medal and Honor

Several authors have received both a Belpré Medal and a Belpré Honor: 
Raúl Colón, David Diaz, Margarita Engle, Carmen Lomas Garza, Susan Guevara, Rafael López, Meg Medina, Yuyi Morales, Pam Muñoz Ryan, and Duncan Tonatiuh.

Works with multiple awards

 Diego: Bigger than Life was the subject of two honors for author and illustrator in 2010.
 The Storyteller's Candle was the subject of two honors for author and illustrator in 2009.
 Just In Case was the subject of a medal for illustrator and an honor for author in 2009.
 Los Gatos Black on Halloween was the subject of a medal for illustrator and an honor for author in 2008
 Doña Flor: A Tall Tale About a Giant Woman with a Great Big Heart was the subject of a medal for illustrator and an honor for author in 2006.
 César: ¡Sí, Se Puede! Yes, We Can! was the subject of two honors for author and illustrator in 2006.
 'El Gallo de Bodas: A Traditional Cuban Folktale was the subject of two honors for author and illustrator in 1996.

Further reading 

 Ebook Central Academic Complete., and Rose Zertuche Treviño. The Pura Belpré Awards: Celebrating Latino Authors and Illustrators. Chicago: American Library Association, 2006.

References

Hispanic and Latino American culture
American children's literary awards
Awards established in 1996
American Library Association awards
Literary awards honoring minority groups
Hispanic and Latino American librarians
American librarianship and human rights
Hispanic and Latino American literature
English-language literary awards
1996 establishments in the United States